La Caine is a commune in the Calvados department in the Normandy region in north-western France.

History
A nunnery was founded at La Caine, probably in 1066.

World War II

Following the Allied Normandy Landings, the headquarters of Panzer Group West was established in the Chateau at La Caine.  The headquarters' new location was revealed to the British intelligence by Ultra's deciphering of German signals traffic.  On 10 June 1944, aircraft of the RAF's Second Tactical Air Force bombed the village killing the German chief of staff and many other personnel.  German communications equipment and vehicles were also destroyed.

Geography
La Caine is about 12 miles southwest of Caen. The municipality is adjacent to Préaux-Bocage in the north, Montillières-sur-Orne in the northeast and east, Ouffières in the southeast, Thury-Harcourt-le-Hom in the south and Montigny in the west.

Demographics
The population changes are known through the population censuses carried out in the municipality since 1793. From 2006, the legal populations of the municipalities have been published annually by Insee.

Religion

La Caine has a small Roman Catholic church, the L'église Notre-Dame.

See also
Communes of the Calvados department

References

Communes of Calvados (department)
Calvados communes articles needing translation from French Wikipedia